"Flossin'&hairsp;" is a song by American record collective Internet Money and American rapper YoungBoy Never Broke Again. It was released on January 20, 2022 and is a bonus track from YoungBoy's mixtape Colors (2022). The song was produced by Taz Taylor, Bryceunknwn, JRhitmaker, Its2ezzy and Y2Tnb.

Composition
The instrumental features a "banging, bass heavy canvas" and "glittering, piano-led rhythm". Over it, YoungBoy raps in aggressive and melodic delivery, warning others he is not one to be taken advantage of and flexing his wealth.

Charts

References

2022 singles
2022 songs
Internet Money songs
YoungBoy Never Broke Again songs
Song recordings produced by Taz Taylor (record producer)
Songs written by YoungBoy Never Broke Again
Songs written by Taz Taylor (record producer)